Saint Ignatius Elias III (13 October 1867 – 13 February 1932) (Syriac: ܐܝܓܢܛܝܘܣ ܐܠܝܐܣ ܬܠܝܬܝܐ) was the Patriarch of Antioch, and head of the Syriac Orthodox Church from 1917 until his death in 1932.

Biography
Nasri was born on October 13, 1867 in the city of Mardin, son of Chorepiscopus Abraham and Mary, and had four brothers and three sisters. He was cared for by his eldest sister Helena upon the death of his mother, and as a teenager he worked as a goldsmith. He also worked for the Ottoman government for three months. Following the direction of Patriarch Ignatius Peter IV, Nasri joined the Forty Martyrs Seminary, and in 1887, he joined the Monastery of Mor Hananyo near Mardin and was ordained deacon by Peter IV. The following year, Nasri became a novice before becoming a monk in 1889, upon which he assumed the name Elias.

Elias was ordained priest in 1892 by Peter IV, and during the Massacres of Diyarbakır in 1895, Elias gave refuge to approximately 7000 Armenian refugees in the Monastery of Mor Quryaqos. After this, Elias was appointed Chief of the Monastery of Mor Quryaqos and Monastery of Mor Hananyo. In 1908, Elias was consecrated bishop of Amid by Patriarch Ignatius Abded Aloho II, upon which he took the name Iwanius.

In 1912, he was transferred to Mosul where he served until his elevation to the patriarchate in 1917. After the death of the Patriarch Abded Aloho II in 1915, Mor Iwanius was elected Patriarch and assumed the throne in 1917. The decree was issued by the Ottoman Sultan Mehmed VI and was confirmed in Elias' visit to Constantinople in 1919, during which he also received the Ismania medal. Elias travelled extensively in 1919 to visit surviving Syriac Orthodox communities in the Middle East in the aftermath of the Assyrian genocide. As a result of the end of the Turkish War of Independence in 1922, Elias was forced to flee the traditional patriarchal residence at the Monastery of Mor Hananyo to Jerusalem where he resided for three months. During this time Elias established a printing press for the church, and in 1925, Elias travelled to Aleppo and Mosul to establish printing presses there also.

Elias held a synod in 1930 at the Monastery of Mar Mattai, near Mosul, to restructure the organisation of the church and its dioceses. Later that year, on 1 December, Elias received a request from Lord Irwin, Viceroy of India, to help resolve a schism within the Malankara Church. Despite cautions from his doctor and eldest sister, Elias left Mosul on 6 February 1931, accompanied by Mor Clemis Yuhanon Abbachi, Rabban Quryaqos, Rabban Yeshu Samuel, Zkaryo Shakir, and Elias Ghaduri, despite his cardiac problems.

Elias and his entourage left from the city of Basra on 28 February and arrived at Karachi on 5 March 1931 where they were received by Patriarchal Delegate Mor Yulius Elias Qoro, Mor Athanasius Paulos of Aluva, as well as other clergymen. Elias then proceeded to Delhi the following day and arrived on 8 March. He met with Lord Irwin in Delhi before leaving to Madras where he was received as a guest of the governor, Sir George Frederick Stanley. Elias arrived in Malankara on 21 March and held meetings between the two factions within the church at Aluva, Karingachira, Panampady and Kuruppumpady for the remainder of the year.

Despite failing to end the schism, Elias remained in India until February 1932 when he died at the Church of St. Ignatius Monastery Manjinikkara on 13 February.  The remains of the patriarch were interred in St. Ignatius Monastery Manjinikkara.

55 years after his death, in 1987, his successor Patriarch Ignatius Zakka I officially declared him a Saint. His feast day is observed on 13 February.

See also
Manjanikkara Dayara
Jacob Baradaeus
Malankara Jacobite Syriac Orthodox Church
Ignatius Zakka I Iwas
Ignatius Afram I Barsoum
Polycarpus Eugene (Augin) Aydin

References

External links
 Biography from Margonitho: Syriac Orthodox Resources
 Syriac Orthodox Church

1867 births
1932 deaths
Syrian Oriental Orthodox Christians
Syriac Orthodox Patriarchs of Antioch
Syrian archbishops
20th-century Oriental Orthodox archbishops
Assyrian saints
Assyrians from the Ottoman Empire
People from Mardin
Oriental Orthodox bishops in the Ottoman Empire